The 1852 United States House of Representatives election in Florida was held on Tuesday, October 5, 1852, to elect the single United States Representative from the state of Florida, one from the state's single at-large congressional district, to represent Florida in the 33rd Congress. The election coincided with the elections of other offices, including the presidential election, the gubernatorial election, and various state and local elections.

The winning candidate would serve a two-year term in the United States House of Representatives from March 4, 1853, to March 4, 1855.

Candidates

Whig

Nominee 

 Edward Carrington Cabell, incumbent U.S. representative

Democratic

Nominee 

 Augustus Maxwell, former state senator and former Florida Attorney General

Campaign
Despite a very popular tenure as a compromise candidate, by 1852, Cabell became very unpopular among Democrats in Florida after a number of smear campaigns accused him of supporting abolitionism. In reality, Cabell was one of Congress' biggest supporters of slavery, and was one of the spearheads behind the Compromise of 1850. Cabell also refused to support the Whig candidate for president, General Winfield Scott, as Scott was perceived to be a trojan horse for abolitionism among many Southern Whigs, most of whom supported President Millard Fillmore at the 1852 Whig National Convention. Cabell opted instead to support the Democratic candidate, former New Hampshire Senator Franklin Pierce, drawing the ire of many staunch Whig supporters in Pensacola.

By the time of the election, after guaranteeing that no Democrat would vote for him and Whig turnout for him would be significantly lower, Cabell narrowly lost the election to Maxwell by just 22 votes.

General election

Results

Results by County

See also
1852 United States presidential election in Florida
United States House of Representatives elections, 1852
1852 Florida gubernatorial election

References

1852
Florida
United States House of Representatives